Richard Marius Joseph Greene (25 August 1918 – 1 June 1985) was a noted English film and television actor. A matinée idol who appeared in more than 40 films, he was perhaps best known for the lead role in the long-running British TV series The Adventures of Robin Hood, which ran for 143 episodes from 1955 to 1959.

Early life
Greene of Irish and Scottish ancestry, and was born in Plymouth, Devon, England. He was raised Roman Catholic, attending Cardinal Vaughan Memorial School (Kensington, London), which he left at age 18. His aunt was actress Evie Greene. His father, Richard Abraham Greene and his mother, Kathleen Gerrard, were both actors with the Plymouth Repertory Theatre. He was the grandson of Richard Bentley Greene and a descendant of four generations of actors.

It has been stated elsewhere that he was the grandson of the inventor William Friese-Greene, (credited by some as the inventor of cinematography) but this was found to be false, as a result of two parallel lines of genealogical research, conducted by the British Film Institute and Paul Pert respectively, the latter being subsequently published in 2009.

Career
He started his stage career as a spear carrier in Shakespeare's Julius Caesar in 1933. A handsome young man, Greene added to his income by modelling shirts and hats.

His professional career began at the age of 15, with a walk-on role in Julius Caesar at the Old Vic. He did some modelling work and appeared in a stage production of Journey's End and had a small role in Sing As We Go (1934), He joined the Jevan Brandon Repertory Company in 1936 with whom he appeared in Antony and Cleopatra. He won accolades in the same year for his part in Terence Rattigan's French Without Tears, which brought him to the attention of MGM, Alexander Korda and Darryl F. Zanuck, who all made offers for films. On 17 January 1938 Greene signed with Fox.

20th Century Fox
At 20, he joined 20th Century Fox as a rival to MGM's Robert Taylor. His first film for Fox was John Ford's Four Men and a Prayer (1938). Greene was a huge success, especially with female film goers, who sent him mountains of fan mail which at its peak rivalled that of Fox star Tyrone Power.

Greene co-starred with Sonia Henie in My Lucky Star (1938) and was reunited with Ford in Submarine Patrol (1939). Zanuck put him in Kentucky (1938) with Loretta Young and Walter Brennan.

Greene was the romantic male lead in the Shirley Temple vehicle The Little Princess (1939) and was Sir Henry Baskerville in the 1939 Sherlock Holmes film The Hound of the Baskervilles. The film marked the first pairing of Basil Rathbone and Nigel Bruce as Sherlock Holmes and Dr. Watson, but it was Greene who was top billed.

Greene had a support part in Stanley and Livingstone (1939) with Spencer Tracy and the lead in Here I Am a Stranger (1939). He co-starred with Alice Faye and Fred MacMurray in Little Old New York (1940) and supported Vera Zorina in I Was an Adventuress (1940). He had failed to become a major star but he was still playing leads in "A" movies when World War II began.

World War II
Greene tried to enlist in the Seaforth Highlanders in Vancouver, but they would not give him a commission. He obtained a release from Fox and travelled to England where he enlisted in the 27th Lancers, where he distinguished himself. After three months, he went to the Royal Military College, Sandhurst and was commissioned and given the service number of 184251. He was promoted to captain in the 27th Lancers in May 1944.

He was given leave in 1942 to appear in the British propaganda films Flying Fortress (1942) for Warners and Unpublished Story (1942) with Valerie Hobson. In 1943, he appeared in the Anna Neagle thriller Yellow Canary while on leave. He also appeared in a British comedy Don't Take It to Heart (1944).

He later toured in Shaw's Arms and the Man, entertaining the troops. Greene was discharged in December 1944 and appeared in the stage play Desert Rats.

Return to Hollywood
After the war he starred in a British musical, distributed by Warners, Gaiety George (1946), which was a flop.

He returned to Hollywood, and appeared in Fox's big budget Forever Amber (1947), but in support of Cornel Wilde. He went to Universal to play the villain in The Fighting O'Flynn (1948) with Douglas Fairbanks Jr. At Fox he was third billed in The Fan (1949), based on the play Lady Windermere's Fan.

Greene returned to England to appear in That Dangerous Age (1949) and Now Barabbas (1949). He went back to Universal in Hollywood to play the hero in a Yvonne de Carlo eastern, The Desert Hawk (1950). Director de Cordova said Greene was "everything a man or woman could want in a desert hero."

In Britain he was in My Daughter Joy (1950), and Shadow of the Eagle (1950). He went to Italy to make The Rival of the Empress (1951). In 1951, he divorced his wife, Patricia Medina, whom he had married in 1941.

In Hollywood Edward Small asked him to play the male hero of Lorna Doone (1951). He stayed on to star in The Black Castle (1952) and support Peter Lawford in Rogue's March (1952). For Small he made The Bandits of Corsica (1953), then he was in another swashbuckler, Captain Scarlett (1953) shot in Mexico.

The Adventures of Robin Hood

Greene returned to Britain looking for work. Reflecting on his career he said "I haven't had the big build-up part I expected. They turned me into a cloak-and-dagger merchant. After four dungeon pictures in a row I decided to throw it up."

Greene got a role on stage in a production of I Capture the Castle with Virginia McKenna. Then Yeoman Films of Great Britain approached him for the lead role in The Adventures of Robin Hood (1955–59). He was an immediate success in it. The series and a number of related marketing products bearing his likeness, such as comic books and "Robin Hood Shoes", solved his financial problems and made him a star.

During the series' run he made the occasional film such as Contraband Spain (1955), Beyond the Curtain (1960), and Sword of Sherwood Forest (1960), as Robin Hood.

He had a long love affair in the 1950s with Nancy Oakes, wealthy daughter of mining tycoon Sir Harry Oakes.

Later career
Amongst other TV programmes, Greene was in A Man For Loving, The Doctors, The Morecambe and Wise Show, Dixon of Dock Green, Scarf Jack, as corrupt businessman Neil Turvey in The Professionals episode "Everest Was Also Conquered", and the Tales of the Unexpected episode "Mrs. Bixby and the Colonel's Coat".

Greene replaced Douglas Wilmer to play Sir Denis Nayland Smith in two of Harry Alan Towers's Fu Manchu films, The Blood of Fu Manchu (1968) and The Castle of Fu Manchu (1969). Both films were directed by Jess Franco and shot in Spain.

Later life and death

In 1972 Greene was unwittingly embroiled in the Lewis v Averay court case, after a fraudster pretending to be Greene had purchased a vehicle.

Greene died in 1985 of cardiac arrest at his home at Kelling Hall, Norfolk, England, aged 66. His daughter, Patricia, said he had never completely recovered from an injury sustained from a fall three years earlier. "He still had quite a fan club and was receiving letters requesting signed pictures", she said.

Filmography

 Sing As We Go (1934) – Bit
 Four Men and a Prayer (1938) – Geoffrey Leigh
 My Lucky Star (1938) – Larry Taylor
 Submarine Patrol (1938) – Perry Townsend III
 Kentucky (1938) – Jack Dillon
 The Little Princess (1939) – Geoffrey Hamilton
 The Hound of the Baskervilles (1939) – Sir Henry Baskerville
 Stanley and Livingstone (1939) – Gareth Tyce
 Here I Am a Stranger (1939) – David Paulding
 Little Old New York (1940) – Robert Fulton
 I Was an Adventuress (1940) – Paul Vernay
 Flying Fortress (1942) – James "Jim" Spence Jr.
 Unpublished Story (1942) – Bob Randall
 Yellow Canary (1943) – Lieutenant Commander Jim Garrick
 Don't Take It to Heart (1944) – Peter Hayward
 Gaiety George, also known as Showtime (1946) – George Howard
 Forever Amber (1947) – Lord Harry Almsbury
 The Fighting O'Flynn (1949) – Lord Philip Sedgemonth
 The Fan (1949) – Lord Arthur Windermere

 That Dangerous Age or If This Be Sin (1949) – Michael Barcleigh
 Now Barabbas (1949) – Tufnell
 The Desert Hawk (1950) – Omar aka The Desert Hawk
 My Daughter Joy (Operation X) (1950) – Larry
 Shadow of the Eagle (1950) – Count Alexei Orloff
 The Rival of the Empress (1951) – Conte Alexei Orloff
 Lorna Doone (1951) – John Ridd
 The Black Castle (1952) – Sir Ronald Burton, alias Richard Beckett
 Rogue's March (1953) – Capt. Thomas Garron
 The Bandits of Corsica (1953) – Mario / Carlos
 Captain Scarlett (1953) – Capt. Carlos Scarlett
 Contraband Spain  (1955) – Treasury Agent Lee Scott
 Beyond the Curtain (1960) – Capt. Jim Kyle
 Sword of Sherwood Forest (1960) – Robin Hood
 Island of the Lost (1968) – Josh MacRae
 The Blood of Fu Manchu (1968) – Sir Dennis Nayland-Smith
 The Castle of Fu Manchu (1969) – Sir Dennis Nayland-Smith
 Tales from the Crypt (1972) – Ralph Jason (segment 4 "Wish You Were Here")

References

External links

 Paul Pert: "From Lens Hood to Robin Hood!"
 Fishko Files, WNYC, 25 June 2010.

1918 births
1985 deaths
Military personnel from Plymouth, Devon
20th-century English male actors
20th Century Studios contract players
27th Lancers officers
British expatriate male actors in the United States
English male film actors
English male television actors
English people of Irish descent
English people of Scottish descent
British Army personnel of World War II
Seaforth Highlanders soldiers
Graduates of the Royal Military College, Sandhurst
Male actors from Plymouth, Devon